Pomerode is a Brazilian municipality in the state of Santa Catarina, in Southern Brazil. It is located in the valley of the Itajaí-Açu river, not very far from the city of Blumenau, one of the largest cities in the state.

Pomerode is known as the most German city in Brazil, because the vast majority of its inhabitants are of German descent and are bilingual in German and Portuguese. The East Pomeranian dialect of Low German is also used by the community.

History and the local language
Pomerode was founded by Pomeranians in 1861 and is considered the "most typically German of all German towns of southern Brazil".

One very remarkable characteristic about Pomerode is the fact that 90% of its residents speak German. There is also a group of persons in the community who speak the East Pomeranian dialect of Low German.

Ethnic composition

Source: IBGE 2010.

Religion

Source: IBGE 2010. 

Lutherans are 63.76% of the population,  as German Pomerania was traditionally overwhelmingly Lutheran. Over time, some of the Pomeranians converted to Catholicism, and Catholics from the rest of Brazil moved into the town.

Tourism and economy

Pomerode has a long history developing its manufacturing industry like other cities in the region. It is also located in a very rich agricultural valley. Additionally, in the last few decades the creation and development of the tourist industry has become a priority. To accomplish that, great efforts are being made to reinforce and celebrate the pioneering roots of the local inhabitants.

Naturally, this has generated a very positive impact on the tourist industry of much smaller Pomerode.

In addition to tourism the economy is dependent on industry, which includes knitted clothing, plastic articles, state of the art metal and mechanical industries, garments and cloth, and furniture.

Notable people 
 Hans Fischer (1961 in Pomerode – 1988) a Brazilian cyclist, he competed at the 1980 and 1984 Summer Olympics

References

External links
Pomerode's official website. Accessed on April 16, 2006.
Portal Pomerodense. In Portuguese, interactive map about the city.
Travel Guide: Pomerode. In English, accessed on April 16, 2006.
Pomerode in Pictures. Visual content, accessed on April 16, 2006.

 
Municipalities in Santa Catarina (state)
German-Brazilian culture